Safety First is a 1926 British silent comedy film directed by Fred Paul and starring Brian Aherne, Queenie Thomas and Mary Brough. It was based on a novel of the same name by Margot Neville.

Cast
 Brian Aherne as Hippocrates Rayne
 Queenie Thomas as Nanda Macdonald
 Mary Brough as Caroline Lowecraft
 Patrick Susands as Birdie Nightingale
 Doreen Banks as Angela StJacques
 Humberston Wright as The Butler
 Fred Morgan as Collins

See also
 Crazy People (1934)

References

Bibliography
 Goble, Alan. The Complete Index to Literary Sources in Film. Walter de Gruyter, 2011. 
 Low, Rachel. The History of British Film: Volume IV, 1918–1929. Routledge, 1997.

External links

1926 films
British comedy films
British silent feature films
1920s English-language films
Films directed by Fred Paul
Stoll Pictures films
Films based on Australian novels
Films shot at Cricklewood Studios
British black-and-white films
1926 comedy films
1920s British films
Silent comedy films